Oleg Viktorovich Petrov (Олег Викторович Петров; born April 18, 1971) is a Russian former ice hockey right winger. He played in the National Hockey League (NHL) between 1992 and 2003.

Professional career
Petrov was drafted 127th overall by the Montreal Canadiens in the 1991 NHL Entry Draft and became the first Russian to play for the team. He played in 382 career NHL games, scoring 72 goals and 115 assists for 187 points. The most goals he ever scored in a single season in the NHL was 24 and the most points he ever achieved was 47. He won a Stanley Cup in 1993 with the Montreal Canadiens; however, he did not play enough games to officially qualify, so his name was not put on the Stanley Cup.

He left the NHL to end his career in Switzerland and signed up with EV Zug in Switzerland's Nationalliga A. He was the team's leading scorer in 2004–05 with 30 goals and 23 assists.

In November 2007, Ak Bars Kazan, which had problems with their roster after losing their second line in the off-season, signed Oleg Petrov, along with Jukka Hentunnen and Petr Ċajanek, to form a new second line. In a 2007 interview with a Russian sport website, Oleg Petrov said that he would consider quitting professional hockey after the season. In the summer of 2009, Oleg Petrov concluded a one-year contract with KHL team Atlant Mytishchi.

In August 2012, Petrov signed a 1-year contract with Spartak Moscow. Later that season, he was traded to HC Lokomotiv (Yaroslavl). He also announced that 2012-2013 would be the last season in his career.

He currently tours across Canada as part of the Montreal Canadiens alumni.

Career statistics

Regular season and playoffs

International

References

External links

1971 births
Living people
Ak Bars Kazan players
EV Zug players
Fredericton Canadiens players
Genève-Servette HC players
HC Ambrì-Piotta players
Atlant Moscow Oblast players
HC CSKA Moscow players
HC Merano players
HC Spartak Moscow players
Lokomotiv Yaroslavl players
Montreal Canadiens draft picks
Montreal Canadiens players
Nashville Predators players
Quebec Citadelles players
Russian ice hockey right wingers
Soviet ice hockey right wingers
Ice hockey people from Moscow
Stanley Cup champions